Harmon is an unincorporated community in Ellis County, Oklahoma, United States.

Olin Branstetter (1929-2011), businessman and Oklahoma state legislator, was born in Harmon.

References

Unincorporated communities in Ellis County, Oklahoma
Unincorporated communities in Oklahoma